Be Yourself Tonight is the fourth studio album by British pop duo Eurythmics, released on 29 April 1985 by RCA Records.

Background
Largely recorded in Paris, with additional recording in Detroit and Los Angeles, this album saw Eurythmics move away from their previous more experimental, synthesizer-based songs, to a more commercial pop/rock sound. Combining elements of Motown and rock music, the album incorporates a more traditional band line-up/instrumentation. Nonetheless, the recordings still possessed an atmospheric and cutting edge sound, winning David A. Stewart awards for his production work on the album. The release of the album coincided with a new look for singer Annie Lennox, who ditched the androgynous look of the previous albums and became, in biographer Lucy O'Brien's words, "a bleach-blonde rock 'n' roller". Be Yourself Tonight includes guest appearances by notable artists such as Aretha Franklin, Stevie Wonder, and Elvis Costello.

Chart performance
Be Yourself Tonight reached the top 3 in the UK and top 10 in the US, as well as spawning several hit singles. The album includes the duo's first (and only) UK number-one "There Must Be an Angel (Playing with My Heart)". The first single released was "Would I Lie to You?". It would hit #5 on the Billboard Hot 100, #6 on the Cash Box Top 100 and also hit #1 in Australia. 

No tour followed the album's release, due to Lennox's recuperation from vocal fold nodules (which also caused her to miss 1985's Live Aid concert).

On 14 November 2005, Sony BMG repackaged and released Eurythmics' back catalogue as "2005 Deluxe Edition Reissues". Each of their eight studio albums' original track listings were supplemented with bonus tracks and remixes.

Track listing

Notes
 Track 9 is incorrectly labelled "Better to Have Lost in Love (Then Never to Have Loved at All)" on the 2005 remastered reissue.
 Track 13 of the 2005 remastered reissue is listed as the "ET Mix", but it is actually the "Extended Mix" from the "Would I Lie to You?" 12-inch single.

Personnel
Credits adapted from the liner notes of Be Yourself Tonight.

Eurythmics
 Annie Lennox – vocals ; keyboards ; keyboard sequencers 
 David A. Stewart – guitars ; sequencers ; keyboards ; bass sequencer, drum computer program ; electric guitar, slide guitar ; six-stringed octave guitar

Additional musicians

 Nathan East – bass 
 Olle Romo – drums ; wood stomping 
 Benmont Tench – organ 
 Dave Plews – trumpet 
 Martin Dobson – saxophones 
 Dean Garcia – bass ; wood stomping 
 Michael Kamen – strings ; celeste ; bass arrangement idea ; keyboard solo, string parts 
 Stevie Wonder – harmonica 
 Angel Cross – backing vocals 
 The Charles Williams Singers – backing vocals ; gospel choir 
 Adam Williams – drum computer program 
 Sadie (and other uncredited performers) – gravel stomping 
 Aretha Franklin – "super" vocals 
 Stan Lynch – drums 
 Mike Campbell – lead guitar 
 Elvis Costello – harmony vocal

Technical
 David A. Stewart – production, mixing
 Adam Williams – mixing ; engineering 
 Don Smith – special help ; engineering ; mixing ; additional engineering 
 Jay Willis – engineering assistance 
 Shelly Yakus – drum recording 
 Stephen Marcussen – mastering

Artwork
 Laurence Stevens – art, design
 Paul Fortune – photography

Charts

Weekly charts

Year-end charts

Certifications and sales

References

Bibliography

Further reading
 

1985 albums
Albums produced by David A. Stewart
Contemporary R&B albums by English artists
Eurythmics albums
RCA Records albums